Welcome to Wedding Hell is a 2022 South Korean streaming television series directed by Song Je-young and Seo Joo-wan, and starring Lee Jin-wook, Lee Yeon-hee, Yoon Yoo-sun and Kil Yong-woo. This KakaoTV original series is a 12 episodes romance that depicts the process of preparing for marriage between a couple in their 30s. The first episode was released on May 23, 2022, on KakaoTV, a new episode was released every Monday, Tuesday and Wednesday at 19:00 (KST) for four weeks. It is available for streaming in selected territories on Netflix.

Synopsis
A couple in their 30s are preparing for their wedding day. Their dream was to have a fairytale event. Facing the reality of organizing, the big day shatters their dream.

Cast

Main
 Lee Jin-wook as Seo Jun-hyung, pre-marriage groom.  
 Lee Yeon-hee as Kim Na-eun, pre-marriage bride.

Supporting

Parents of Jun-hyung
 Kil Yong-woo as Seo Jong-soo, father of Jun-hyung, an executive at a large corporation. 
 Yoon Yoo-sun as Park Mi-sook, mother of Jun-hyung, a housewife and a strong wife's force.

Parents of Na-eun
 Im Ha-ryong as Kim Soo-chan, Na-eun's father, running a real estate brokerage business with his wife.
 Kim Mi-kyung as Lee Dal-yeong, Na-eun's mother, running a real estate brokerage business with her husband.

Co-workers and friends of couple
 Hwang Seung-eon as Choi Hee-seon, a senior at Na-eun's company with a bubbly wit.
 Song Jin-woo as Jang Min-woo, best friend of Jun-hyung.
 Kim Joo-yeon as Lee Soo-yeon, a co-worker of Na-eun.

Production
In December 2021, Lee Jin-wook was confirmed to play protagonist of KakaoTV's original series. On April 21, first script reading scenes were released with major cast members and directors Song Je-young and Seo Joo-wan.

Episodes

Original soundtrack

Part 1

Part 2

Reception
Jonathon Wilson of Ready Steady Cut graded the first episode "First Pitch" with 3 stars out of 5 and wrote, "“First Pitch” is a light, breezy opening that establishes a simple premise with welcome economy."

References

External links
 

 

KakaoTV original programming
South Korean web series
South Korean drama web series
South Korean romance television series
2022 South Korean television series debuts
2022 South Korean television series endings
2022 web series debuts
2022 web series endings
Korean-language Netflix exclusive international distribution programming